Rhabdatomis pueblae is a moth in the subfamily Arctiinae. It was described by Max Wilhelm Karl Draudt in 1919. It is found in Mexico.

References

Moths described in 1919
Cisthenina